Rebecca Vincent (born April 28, 1983) is an American human rights campaigner, who is currently the Director of International Campaigns and UK Bureau Director for Reporters Without Borders.

Career

Early career 
Vincent began her career in the U.S. Department for State. From 2005 to 2008, Vincent was stationed in US Embassy in Baku, Azerbaijan, covering the democracy and human rights portfolios. Vincent also spent time as a political reporting officer at the US Mission to the United Nations in New York, covering proceedings of the 63rd General Assembly and the Third (Social, Humanitarian, and Cultural) Committee.

Human Rights Campaigner 
In 2012, the Azerbaijani Government banned Vincent from the country after she attended an art exhibition there called "Sing for Democracy."  The government described her attendance as "interference in the internal affairs of the country".

Vincent served as the coordinator for the Sport for Rights campaign while working with Article 19.

In 2016, Vincent joined Reporters Without Borders to open and run its London bureau. In June 2020, she was appointed to the new global role of Director of International Campaigns.

References

American women journalists
American human rights activists
Women human rights activists
Living people
1983 births
21st-century American women